Magicopolis is a 150-seat theater in Santa Monica, California, founded in 1998 by magician Steve Spill. It is the permanent home of his magic production, "Escape Reality", which has received positive reviews from guests and critics.  Magicians Penn & Teller cast their hands and feet in cement for the Magicopolis groundbreaking ceremony on March 25, 1998.  Robert Holbrook, Mayor of the City of Santa Monica, on behalf of the City Council proclaimed March 25 to be "Magicopolis Day" in Santa Monica.  Friday, September 18, 1998, marked the grand opening, and official ribbon cutters and special guest performers Penn & Teller took the stage and over the course of the evening performed some of their classic routines. To finish, Penn delivered a "heartfelt discourse on the value of seeing magic performed live and the importance of Magicopolis".

References

External links 
 
 LA Times Guide Entry
 The Magic Café Guest of Honor 2008

Buildings and structures in Santa Monica, California
Landmarks in Los Angeles
Nightclubs in Los Angeles County, California
Magic clubs
Theatres completed in 1998
Tourist attractions in Santa Monica, California
1998 establishments in California
Companies based in Santa Monica, California